Patrícia Fernandes Sampaio (born 30 June 1999) is a Portuguese judoka. In 2021, she competed in the women's 78 kg event at the 2020 Summer Olympics in Tokyo, Japan.

She is the gold medallist of the 2019 Judo Perth Oceania Open in the -70 kg category.

She won one of the bronze medals in her event at the 2022 Judo Grand Slam Tel Aviv held in Tel Aviv, Israel.

References

External links
 
 
 

1999 births
Living people
People from Tomar
Portuguese female judoka
Judoka at the 2019 European Games
European Games silver medalists for Portugal
European Games medalists in judo
Competitors at the 2018 Mediterranean Games
Judoka at the 2020 Summer Olympics
Olympic judoka of Portugal
Sportspeople from Santarém District
20th-century Portuguese women
21st-century Portuguese women